A Visit With the Armed Forces was a 30-minute TV series which aired on the now-defunct DuMont Television Network Mondays at 8pm EST from July 3, 1950, to January 22, 1951. As its title suggests, the series consisted of documentary films on the United States armed forces.

Episode status
Little else is known about the series, and it appears that no episodes survive.

See also
List of programs broadcast by the DuMont Television Network
List of surviving DuMont Television Network broadcasts
1950-51 United States network television schedule

Bibliography
David Weinstein, The Forgotten Network: DuMont and the Birth of American Television (Philadelphia: Temple University Press, 2004) 
Alex McNeil, Total Television, Fourth edition (New York: Penguin Books, 1980) 
Tim Brooks and Earle Marsh, The Complete Directory to Prime Time Network TV Shows, Third edition (New York: Ballantine Books, 1964)

External links
 
DuMont historical website

1950 American television series debuts
1951 American television series endings
1950s American documentary television series
Black-and-white American television shows
DuMont Television Network original programming
English-language television shows
Lost television shows
Mass media of the military of the United States
DuMont news programming